Grangemouth Stags is a rugby union club based in Grangemouth, Scotland. The club play their home matches at Glensburgh Park.

History

There was a previous club in Grangemouth connected to the chemical firm I.C.I. This club was founded for season 1962–63. However I.C.I. Grangemouth RFC disbanded and transferred its assets to Falkirk RFC in 1972.

Women's rugby

The club run a women's side called the Stagettes.

Sevens

The club runs the Grangemouth Sevens tournament.

Honours

Men's

 Scottish National League Division Three
 Champions (1): 1992
 Caledonia League Division Two Midlands
 Champions (1): 2016-17
 Glasgow City Sevens
 Champions (3): 1971, 1994, 1995
 Cambuslang Sevens
 Champions (1): 1992
 Lanarkshire Sevens
 Champions (1): 1975
 Orkney Sevens
 Champions (9): 1990, 1991, 1992, 1993, 1994, 1995, 1997, 2002, 2005
 Glasgow University Sevens
 Champions (1): 1992
 Drumpellier Sevens
 Champions (2): 1990, 1991
 Glenrothes Sevens
 Champions (1): 1996
 Kirkcaldy Sevens
 Champions (1): 1996

References

Grangemouth
Scottish rugby union teams
Sport in Falkirk (council area)
1929 establishments in Scotland
Rugby clubs established in 1929